Witmer is an unincorporated community and census-designated place (CDP) in East Lampeter Township, Lancaster County, Pennsylvania, United States. As of the 2010 census the population was 492.

Geography
Witmer is in central Lancaster County, in the eastern part of East Lampeter Township. It is bordered to the south by Smoketown and to the northeast by Upper Leacock Township.

The community drains west to Stauffer Run and east to Mill Creek, both tributaries of the Conestoga River, flowing southwest to the Susquehanna.

References

Census-designated places in Lancaster County, Pennsylvania
Census-designated places in Pennsylvania